Ágnes Bukta (born 29 October 1993) is an inactive Hungarian tennis player.

Bukta has won eight singles and 20 doubles titles on the ITF Women's Circuit. On 16 October 2016, she reached her best singles ranking of world No. 294. On 1 May 2017, she peaked at No. 209 in the WTA doubles rankings.

Bukta was given a wildcard for the 2013 Budapest Grand Prix where she made her WTA Tour main-draw debut appearance in July 2013. She defeated Sandra Záhlavová in the first round in a third-set tiebreak only to be beaten in straight sets by eventual champion Simona Halep in round two.

ITF Circuit finals

Singles: 13 (8–5)

Doubles: 36 (20–16)

ITF Junior finals

Singles (1–1)

Doubles (2–1)

National representation

Fed Cup
Bukta made her Fed Cup debut for Hungary in 2017, while the team was competing in the Europe/Africa Zone Group I, when she was 23 years and 103 days old.

Fed Cup (2–0)

Singles (1–0)

Doubles (1–0)

References

External links
 
 
 

1993 births
Living people
People from Szolnok
Hungarian female tennis players
Sportspeople from Jász-Nagykun-Szolnok County